"Would You Ever" is a song by American producer Skrillex featuring vocals from Jason "Poo Bear" Boyd. It is Boyd's first official single as a lead vocalist. The song was released through Skrillex's label Owsla and Atlantic Records. Skrillex and Boyd previously worked together on the Justin Bieber collaboration "Where Are Ü Now".

Music video 
The music video was released on July 26, 2017, on Skrillex's YouTube channel. It features professional longboard dancer Milan "Hairy Longboarder" Somerville, as well as appearances by Skrillex and Poo Bear. The longboard portion of the video was filmed near the intersection of Fort Tejon Road and Largo Vista Road in the small town of Llano in Los Angeles County. The scene that included Skrillex and Poo Bear was filmed on the cliffs of Corona Del Mar Main Beach, a neighborhood of Newport Beach in Orange County, California.

Charts

Weekly charts

Year-end charts

Certifications

References 

2017 singles
2017 songs
Deep house songs
Skrillex songs
Atlantic Records singles
Songs written by Skrillex
Songs written by Poo Bear
Owsla singles